The 1992 Campeonato Paulista de Futebol Profissional da Primeira Divisão - Série A1 was the 91st season of São Paulo's top professional football league. São Paulo won the championship by the 18th time. No teams were relegated.

Championship
The twenty-eight teams of the championship were divided into two groups of fourteen teams.  Group A comprised the eight best teams of the Green Group and the six best teams of the Yellow Group in the previous year.  Group B comprised the bottom six of the Green Group, the other teams of the Yellow Group and the champion of the second level.  Every team played twice against the teams of its own group, and the six best teams of Group A and the two best teams of Group B qualified to the Second phase. No teams were to be relegated that year.

The Second phase's eight teams were divided into two groups of four, with every team playing twice against the teams of its own group and the winners of each group qualifying to the Finals.

First phase

Group A

Group B

Second phase

Group 1

Group 2

Finals

|}

References

Campeonato Paulista seasons
Paulista